G. A. Sturgis was an early California politician and pioneer to Los Angeles. He served on the second Los Angeles County Board of Supervisors in 1853.

The first County Supervisors in 1852 for Los Angeles were Jefferson Hunt, Julian A. Chavez, Francisco P. Temple, Manuel Requena, and Samuel Arbuckle.

The second County Supervisors in 1853 for Los Angeles were David W. Alexander, Leonardo Cota, G. A. Sturgis, Daniel M. Thomas, and Benjamin D. Wilson ("Don Benito").

Year of birth missing
Year of death missing
Los Angeles County Board of Supervisors